Disraeli is a 1916 British silent biographical film directed by Charles Calvert and Percy Nash and starring Dennis Eadie, Mary Jerrold and Cyril Raymond. The film was based on the 1911 play Disraeli by Louis N. Parker, which was adapted twice more, as a 1921 silent version and most famously in 1929, as an early sound film. It was made at Ealing Studios.

When actor George Arliss who had made his name appearing in the play, wanted to make the 1921 version in America he acquired the rights from producer Arrigo Bocchi and oversaw the destruction of all copies of the original film.

Synopsis
The mid-Victorian statesman Benjamin Disraeli manages to thwart the plans of Britain's rival Great Powers and gain control of the strategically important Suez Canal.

Cast
 Dennis Eadie as Benjamin Disraeli
 Mary Jerrold as Lady Beaconsfield
 Cyril Raymond as Lord Deeford
 Dorothy Bellew as Clarissa
 Fred Morgan as Nigel Foljambe
 Daisy Cordell as Mrs. Travers
 Cecil Morton York as Duke of Glastonbury
 Evelyn Harding as Duchess of Glastonbury
 Arthur M. Cullin as Sir Michael Probert
 A. B. Imeson as Meyers
 Mrs. Henry Lytton as Queen Victoria

References

Bibliography
 Fells, Robert M. George Arliss: The Man Who Played God . Scarecrow Press, 2004.
 Low, Rachael. History of the British Film, 1914-1918. Routledge, 2005.

External links

1916 films
1910s political drama films
1910s historical drama films
British political drama films
British historical drama films
Films directed by Charles Calvert
Films directed by Percy Nash
British silent feature films
Ealing Studios films
British films based on plays
Films set in London
Films set in the 19th century
Films set in the 1870s
Cultural depictions of Benjamin Disraeli
Films about prime ministers of the United Kingdom
Cultural depictions of Queen Victoria on film
British black-and-white films
1916 drama films
1910s English-language films
1910s British films
Silent historical drama films